This is an incomplete list of people who have served as Lord Lieutenant for Gwynedd. The office was created on 1 April 1974.

Sir Richard Williams-Bulkeley, 13th Baronet 1 April 1974 – 1980? (formerly Lord Lieutenant of Anglesey) with two lieutenants:
 Sir Michael Duff, 3rd Baronet (formerly Lord Lieutenant of Caernarvonshire) 1 April 1974 – 3 March 1980
 Col. John Francis Williams-Wynne, CBE, DSO (formerly Lord Lieutenant of Merionethshire) 1 April 1974 – 1983?
Henry Paget, 7th Marquess of Anglesey 18 October 1983 – 5 March 1990
Sir Richard Ellis Meuric Rees 5 March 1990 – 24 February 2000
Prof. Eric Sunderland 24 February 2000 – 21 October 2005
Huw Morgan Daniel 1 May 2006 – 2014
Edmund Seymour Bailey 16 April 2014 – present

References
 the Lord-Lieutenants Order 1973 (1973/1754)

Gwynedd
Gwynedd
 
1974 establishments in Wales